Abandoned Mansion is the ninth studio album by psychedelic rock band Dr. Dog. It was released on November 29, 2016, and is the band's first on the We Buy Gold Records record label. The album was produced and engineered by Nathan Sabatino and recorded in 2014 in the band's Mt. Slippery studio in Clifton Heights, PA.

Album information
On November 29, 2016, Dr. Dog dropped a surprise album on Bandcamp titled Abandoned Mansion. The album was made available to stream for free and all proceeds received through January 31, 2017 would benefit the Southern Poverty Law Center.

Track listing

Personnel
Dr. Dog is:
Toby Mark Leaman—vocals, bass 
Scott Anthony McMicken—vocals, guitar 
Zachery Ulrich Miller—keys 
Francis Xavier McElroy—guitar, vocals 
Eric James Marshall Slick—drums 
Dimitri Robert Manos—percussion, drums, guitar

Guest Musicians: 
Conner Gallaher—pedal steel on “Both Sides of the Line” 
String quartet Sarah Larsen (viola), Valerie Vuolo (violin), Kaveh Saidi (violin), John Thorell (cello) on “I Saw Her for the First Time” 
Arranged by: Sarah Larsen.

References

2016 albums
Dr. Dog albums
Anti- (record label) albums